Gentlemen Are Born is a 1934 American drama film directed by Alfred E. Green and starring Franchot Tone, Jean Muir and Margaret Lindsay . The film's pre-release title was Just Out of College. A news item in Daily Variety notes that Warner Bros. was sued for $250,000 by Ronald Wagoner and James F. Wickizer who contended that the film was based on their story "Yesterday's Heroes."

Plot
Four friends, Bob Bailey (Tone), Tom Martin (Ross Alexander), Smudge Casey (Dick Foran) and Fred Harper (Robert Light), are certain that upon their graduation from college, they will conquer the world. They face disappointment when they look for jobs, however. Because of the Depression, jobs are scarce and each one has many applicants.

Fred goes to work for his father, Mr. Harper (Henry O'Neill), a prominent stockbroker. Eventually Bob, who intends to become a journalist, manages to sell occasional articles to the newspaper, and Tom also finds work. Smudge, a star athlete, unsuccessfully looks for work as a coach. Tom is in love with Trudy Talbot (Jean Muir), who moves to New York to be near him. She shares a room with Susan Merrill (Ann Dvorak), a librarian. Tom invites Bob to double date with him and Trudy, hoping that he will become interested in Susan, but Bob is in love with Fred's sister Joan Harper (Margaret Lindsay), even though they are of different social classes. When Bob attends a boxing match on assignment from the paper, he sees Smudge fighting for a few dollars.

Realizing that Smudge is broke, Susan and Bob invite him for Sunday breakfast. Soon Susan and Smudge fall in love. Shortly after, Tom and Trudy marry, as do Susan and Smudge. Joan and Bob date despite her mother's wishes that she only go out with men of her class. Smudge is fired from his job as a truck driver because there is not enough work and Susan loses her job because she is married. Meanwhile, Tom and Trudy have a baby. Mr. Harper is implicated in a trust failure and kills himself, leaving his family in reduced circumstances. To ensure the financial security of her family, Joan decides to sacrifice her own happiness and set her love for Bob aside to instead accept a proposal from wealthy Stephen Hornblow (Charles Starrett).

Completely desperate, Smudge impulsively robs a pawnshop of ten dollars in order to buy food and he is shot running away. Smudge dies, but Bob at least manages to keep his identity out of the papers; Susan returns to her parents. When Joan meets Bob at Tom and Trudy's, where they have gone to visit the new baby, she tells him that she has changed her mind about Stephen's proposal since she knows he won't make her happy. Rather than worry about her family, she will follow her heart and marry Bob.

Cast

 Franchot Tone as Bob Bailey
 Jean Muir as Trudy Talbot
 Margaret Lindsay as Joan Harper
 Ann Dvorak as Susan Merrill
 Ross Alexander as Tom Martin
 Dick Foran as Smudge Casey
 Charles Starrett as Stephen Hornblow
 Russell Hicks as Editor
 Robert Light as Fred Harper
 Addison Richards as Martinson
 Henry O'Neill as Mr. Harper
 Arthur Aylesworth as Mr. Gillespie
 Marjorie Gateson as Mrs. Harper
 Bradley Page as Al
 Edward Mosbar as Tom Texas
 Virginia Howell as Miss Graham
 James Burtis as Moe

References

External links

1934 films
1934 drama films
American drama films
American black-and-white films
Films directed by Alfred E. Green
Warner Bros. films
1930s English-language films
1930s American films